Good Shepherd International School is a residential school founded in 1977, located at Ootacamund (Ooty), in Nilgiris, Tamil Nadu, India on a  campus. Facilities on the campus include classrooms and laboratory blocks, two lecture theatres, two indoor sports complexes, rifle ranges, fields and courts for tennis, golf, volleyball, basketball, squash, hockey, cricket, and association football. There are stables and equestrian facilities, two swimming pools, and a medical centre.

Affiliations
10th grade students take the Indian Certificate of Secondary Education. The following subjects to be taken: English, an Indian language (Tamil, Hindi) or a foreign language French, history, civics, and geography, any two from economics, math, science (physics, chemistry, biology) and any one from art and computer applications.

12th grade students take the Indian School Certificate Examination. Any one of the following subject combinations are to be taken: 

Physics, Chemistry, Biology, Mathematics
Physics, Chemistry, Biology, Psychology
Physics, Chemistry, Mathematics, Computer Science
Physics, Chemistry, Mathematics, Economics 
Accounts, Commerce, Economics, Business Studies 
Accounts, Commerce, Economics, Mathematics
Accounts, Commerce, Economics, Psychology

The International General Certificate of Secondary Education (Grades IX to X) is offered to all students seeking future international education, and is available with two options; the Science section and the Commerce section. The subjects offered at the science section are biology, chemistry, physics, math, English language and composition, a second language (Tamil, French, Spanish, Thai, or Hindi), and an additional subject (English literature, geography, or business studies).

The school also offers the Cambridge Primary Programme at Primary School (Classes up to VI), the Cambridge Lower Secondary Programme at Middle School and the IGCSE Curriculum of the Cambridge International Examinations (classes 4 to 10) and the International Baccalaureate Diploma Programme of the International Baccalaureate Organisation (classes 11 and 12).

Co-curricular activities
The school include horse riding, football (soccer), basketball, tennis, swimming, water polo, cricket, volleyball, hockey, table tennis, badminton, squash, and golf. Students are required to take part in sports. Performing arts include Western and Indian music, brass and pipe bands, choirs, solo singing, and traditional and modern instruments. Every year at the Founder's Day ceremony students perform dances and shows.  Outward bound offered are camping, trekking, and mountaineering. All grades have a week of mountaineering activities. The school takes part in the Duke of Edinburgh Award Scheme.

The school has a unit of the Sea Cadet Corps, and is a registered centre of NASA for field study and leadership training. 65 students go every year to the NASA Space Center, Huntsville, Alabama, United States.

Music
The school is a recognized examination centre for the Trinity College of Music. Trinity Guildhall offers a range of grade examinations for all instruments and voice across nine levels from Initial to Grade 8 and beyond. Students choose from instruments like the piano, violin, keyboard, guitar, recorder, drum kit, snare drum, saxophone, trumpet, flute, xylophone, baritone, euphonium, etc., for the TCL Practical Examinations. All high school and middle school students are required to take the Theory Music Exams.

See also

SSVM_Institutions, Coimbatore
SCAD World School, Coimbatore
St. Joseph's Higher Secondary School, Ooty
 St. Joseph's Boys School, Coonoor
 Breeks Memorial School, Ooty
 Hebron School, Ooty
 Lawrence School, Lovedale, Ooty
 Woodside School, Ooty
 Stanes Hr.Sec. School, Coonoor

References

External links
GSIS Official website
GSFS Official website
The GSIS alumni website

International schools in India
Cambridge schools in India
Boarding schools in Tamil Nadu
Primary schools in Tamil Nadu
High schools and secondary schools in Tamil Nadu
Schools in Nilgiris district
Education in Ooty
Educational institutions established in 1977
1977 establishments in Tamil Nadu